Two ships of the Royal Navy have borne the name HMS Whirlwind, after the whirlwind, an atmospheric phenomenon:

  was a W-class destroyer launched in 1917 and sunk in 1940.
  was a W-class destroyer launched in 1943, converted into a Type 15 anti-submarine frigate in 1953, and sunk as a target in 1974.

Royal Navy ship names